Leo Narducci (b. 1932) is an American fashion designer.

Biography 
Born and raised in Brockton, Massachusetts, Narducci's parents owned a garment factory, where he learned to sew and developed a fascination with fashion. In 1950, he graduated from Brockton High School. After serving in the Air Force in Korea, Narducci attended the Rhode Island School of Design, where he graduated in 1960. After graduation, he moved to New York, where he initially designed for Loomtogs. In 1965 he won the Coty Award for Young Designers, and in 1967 opened his own studio.

A prominent designer during the 1960s and 1970s, his clothes were popular with celebrities like Kaye Stevens and Joyce Brothers, and in 1972 Narducci was a guest on the Mike Douglas Show. Although most well-known for his ready-to-wear collections, Narducci also designed scarfs, belts, jewelry, evening bags, Vogue patterns, and career apparel. He also produced samples in size 16 (in an era when most samples were size 8 or 10) so that the proportions would be correct for larger-sized women. He employed or mentored other prominent designers, including Bill Robinson and Stephen Sprouse.

In the early 1990s, Narducci moved back to Brockton, where he frequently put on fashion shows to benefit area organizations like Stonehill College and the Fuller Craft Museum. In 2003, he was honored with the Historic Citizen's Award by the Brockton Historical Society.

Narducci resides in Providence, Rhode Island, where he designs and teaches at RISD.

References

External Links 
 Official site
 IMDB page
 Museum of Fine Arts, Houston
 RISD Museum

1932 births
Living people
American fashion designers
People from Brockton, Massachusetts
Rhode Island School of Design alumni